John Pope Harllee III (May 8, 1942 – December 5, 2017) was an American politician. He served as a Democratic member for the 72nd and 115th districts of the Florida House of Representatives.

Harllee was born in Bradenton, Florida, the son of Sara Scott and J. P. Harllee Jr. Harllee was raised in Palmetto, Florida and graduated from Palmetto High School in 1960. He then attended Florida State University where he earned a Bachelor of Science degree. While there he played football and was a member of the  Phi Delta Theta fraternity. Harllee was awarded a Juris Doctor degree by the University of Florida Levin College of Law in 1967, and moved to Manatee County, Florida in 1968.

In 1970, Harllee was elected for the 115th district of the Florida House of Representatives. In 1972 he moved to the 72nd district, serving until 1974.

Harllee died in December 2017, at the age of 75.

References 

1942 births
2017 deaths
People from Bradenton, Florida
Democratic Party members of the Florida House of Representatives
20th-century American politicians
Florida State University alumni